Milton Kenneth "Milt, Curly" Brink (b. November 26, 1910 in Hibbing, Minnesota – d. October 31, 1999) was an American professional ice hockey center who played five games in the National Hockey League with the Chicago Black Hawks. Brink spent most of his career in the American Hockey Association.

External links

1910 births
1999 deaths
American men's ice hockey centers
Boston Cubs players
Chicago Blackhawks players
Ice hockey players from Minnesota
Kansas City Greyhounds players
Minneapolis Millers (AHA) players
Sportspeople from Hibbing, Minnesota
United States Hockey Hall of Fame inductees
Wichita Skyhawks players